The Japan women's national 3x3 team is a national 3x3 basketball team of Japan, administered by the Japan Basketball Association.

It represents the country in international 3x3 (3 against 3) women's basketball competitions.

As of late 2019, the head coach was Torsten Loibl.

Tournament record

Olympic Games

World Cup

Asia Cup

Asian Games

Current roster
Source: 
}

Practice facilities
Ajinomoto National Training Center

See also
Sport in Japan
Basketball in Japan
Japan women's national under-23 3x3 team
Japan women's national basketball team
Japan men's national 3x3 team

References

External links
 

3x3
Women's national 3x3 basketball teams